Chris Enss (born 1961) is an American author and screenwriter. Enss has written more than 20 books on the subject of women in the Old West, and has collaborated with producer Howard Kazanjian on four books, including two about Roy Rogers and Dale Evans.

Partial bibliography
 Buffalo Gals: Women of Buffalo Bill's Wild West Show
 Gilded Girls: Women Entertainers of the Old West
 Hearts West: True Stories of Mail-Order Brides on the Frontier
 How the West Was Worn: Bustles and Buckskins on the Wild Frontier
 Love Untamed: Romances of the Old West
 Pistol Packin' Madams: True Stories of Notorious Women of the Old West
 She Wore a Yellow Ribbon: Women Soldiers and Patriots of the Western Frontier
 The Doctor Wore Petticoats: Women Physicians of the Old West
 With Great Hope: Women of the California Gold Rush
 Tales Behind the Tombstones: The Deaths and Burials of the Old West's Most Nefarious Outlaws, Notorious Women and Celebrated Lawmen
 The Lady Was a Gambler: True Stories of Notorious Women of the Old West
 Playing for Time: The Death Row All Stars
 The Cowboy and the Señorita: A Biography of Roy Rogers and Dale Evans
 Happy Trails: A Pictorial Celebration of the Life and Times of Roy Rogers and Dale Evans
 The Young Duke: The Early Life of John Wayne

References

External links
 Chris Enss official website

1961 births
Living people
American women screenwriters
20th-century American women writers
21st-century American women writers
20th-century American writers
21st-century American writers
Screenwriters from California